Pond Meadow School is a small special school with academy status located in Guildford, Surrey, England for pupils aged 2 – 19.

References

Special schools in Surrey
Academies in Surrey
Educational institutions established in 1980
1980 establishments in England